Friday Joy Package is a South Korean television program that airs on tvN every Friday at 21:10 (KST) from January 10 to March 27, 2020.

Synopsis
The program is an omnibus program which consists of six different corners, each corner lasting for only 15 minutes per episode. The genres of the corners are sports, science, art, travel, cooking and labour.

Corners and cast members

List of episodes 
The listing of the corners are based on the sequence it is shown per episode. The corner names are named the genres of the corners.

Ratings

From episode 4 to 7, the ratings are recorded as Part 1 and Part 2.

2020

Notes

References

External links
Official Website 

2020 South Korean television series debuts
2020 South Korean television series endings
Korean-language television shows
South Korean variety television shows
TVN (South Korean TV channel) original programming